The Polnische Schul (Pronunciation: [ˈpɔlnɪʃə] ['ʃuːl], English: "Polish synagogue") was a synagogue in Leopoldsgasse, Vienna.

It was built by the noted architect Wilhelm Stiassny in 1892. It was built specifically for the Polish Jewish community in the late 19th century. The Polnische Schul was destroyed during the Reichskristallnacht in 1938. Today a modern building stands there with a Tafel.

Jews from Galicia, the part of Poland in the Austro-Hungarian Empire after the division of Poland (1795), were known as Polish Jews in Vienna.  This was one of their places of worship.

Literature 
 Bob Martens, Herbert Peter: "The Destroyed Synagogues of Vienna - Virtual city walks". Vienna: LIT Verlag, 2011.

Ashkenazi Jewish culture in Austria
Polnische Schul
Polnische Schul
Polnische Schul
Jewish Galician (Eastern Europe) history
Jews from Galicia (Eastern Europe)
Jewish Polish history
Polish diaspora in Europe
Polish communities
Polish-Jewish diaspora
Synagogues completed in 1892
Polnische Schul